Alexei Kozlov (born 8 June 1979, in Tallinn) is an Estonian former competitive figure skater. He is the 1997 Ondrej Nepela Memorial silver medalist, the 1998 Piruetten bronze medalist, and a three-time (2001, 2003 & 2004) Estonian national champion. He reached the free skate at two ISU Championship, finishing 14th at the 1998 Junior Worlds in Saint John, New Brunswick, Canada, and 18th at the 2001 Europeans in Bratislava, Slovakia.

Programs

Results

References

External links
 
 Tracings.net profile

Estonian male single skaters
1979 births
Figure skaters from Tallinn
Living people
Estonian people of Russian descent
Competitors at the 2001 Winter Universiade